SMS Augsburg was a  light cruiser of the German Kaiserliche Marine (Imperial Navy) during the First World War. The ship was built by the Kaiserliche Werft in Kiel; her hull was laid down in 1908 and she was launched in July 1909. Augsburg was commissioned into the High Seas Fleet in October 1910.

After her commissioning, Augsburg spent her peacetime career first as a torpedo test ship and then as a gunnery training ship. After the outbreak of World War I, she was assigned to the Baltic Sea, where she spent the entire war. On 2 August 1914, she participated in an operation that saw the first shots of the war with Russia fired, and she later took part in the Battle of the Gulf of Riga in August 1915 and Operation Albion in October 1917, as well as numerous smaller engagements throughout the war. She struck a mine, once, in January 1915, though the ship was again operational in a few months. After the end of the war, Augsburg was ceded to Japan as a war prize, and was subsequently broken up for scrap in 1922.

Design

Her propulsion system consisted of two sets of Parsons steam turbines driving four  propellers. They were designed to give . These were powered by fifteen coal-fired Marine water-tube boilers. Augsburg had a crew of 18 officers and 349 enlisted men.

The ship was armed with a main battery of twelve  SK L/45 guns in single pedestal mounts. Two were placed side by side forward on the forecastle, eight were located amidships, four on either side, and two were side by side aft. These were replaced in 1916–1917 with six  sK L/45 guns. She also carried four  SK L/55 anti-aircraft guns, though these were replaced with a pair of two  SK L/45 anti-aircraft guns in 1918. She was also equipped with a pair of  torpedo tubes submerged in the hull. Two deck-mounted  torpedo tube launchers were added in 1918. She could also carry 100 mines.

Service history

Augsburg was ordered as a replacement for  under the contract name Ersatz Sperber and was laid down in 1908 at the Kaiserliche Werft shipyard in Kiel. She was launched on 10 July 1909, after which fitting-out work commenced. She was commissioned into the High Seas Fleet on 1 October 1910. After her commissioning, Augsburg was used as a torpedo test ship. In 1912, she was transferred to gunnery training. On 20 May 1914 she visited Dundee on a courtesy visit. Captain Fischer and his crew were welcomed by the Lord Provost and "the greatest friendliness was displayed".

World War I

1914
Following the outbreak of World War I in August 1914, she was assigned to the Baltic Sea, under the command of Rear Admiral Robert Mischke. On 2 August, Augsburg laid a minefield outside the Russian harbor of Libau, while  shelled the port. The Russians had in fact already left Libau, which was seized by the German Army. The minefield laid by Augsburg was poorly marked and hindered German operations more than Russian efforts. Augsburg and the rest of the Baltic light forces then conducted a series of bombardments of Russian positions.

In September, the light forces in the Baltic were reinforced with the IV Battle Squadron, composed of the older  and s, and the large armored cruiser . Starting on 3 September, the combined German force conducted a sweep into the Baltic. She attempted to draw them closer to Blücher, but the Russians refused to take the bait and withdrew. On 7 September, Augsburg and the torpedo boat  steamed into the Gulf of Bothnia and sank a Russian steamer off Raumo. By the 9th, the German fleet had returned to port.

1915–1916
On the night of 24–25 January 1915, Augsburg ran into a Russian minefield off Bornholm and struck a mine. The crew kept the ship afloat, and she was towed back to port for repairs. Augsburg was back in service by April, ready for a major operation against Libau. The German Army planned to seize the port as a distraction from the main Austro-German effort at Gorlice–Tarnów. They requested naval support, and so the Navy organized a force comprising the coastal defense ship , three armored cruisers, three light cruisers, including Augsburg, and a large number of torpedo boats and minesweepers. In addition, the IV Scouting Group, consisting of four light cruisers and twenty-one torpedo boats, was sent from the North Sea to reinforce the operation. The German Army captured Libau in May, and it was subsequently turned into an advance base for the German Navy. A submarine attack on the cruiser , however, prompted the German naval command to cancel the operation.

On 1 June, Augsburg, Roon, Lübeck, and seven torpedo boats escorted the minelaying cruiser  while she laid a field off Bogskär. Augsburg served as the flagship of Commodore Johannes von Karpf, the commander of the operation. After finishing laying the minefield, Karpf sent a wireless transmission informing headquarters he had accomplished the mission, and was returning to port. This message was intercepted by the Russians, allowing them to intercept the Germans. Four Russian armored cruisers, with the powerful armored cruiser  steaming in support, attempted to ambush the German squadron. Karpf dispersed his force shortly before encountering the Russians; Augsburg, Albatross, and three torpedo boats steamed to Rixhöft while the remainder went to Libau. Shortly after 06:30 on 2 June, lookouts on Augsburg spotted the Russian force; Karpf ordered the slower Albatross to seek refuge in neutral Swedish waters, while Augsburg and the torpedo boats used their high speed to escape the Russians. In the engagement that followed, Albatross was badly damaged and ran aground in Swedish waters. The Russians then turned to engage the second German force, but were low on ammunition after the engagement with Augsburg and Albatross and broke off the engagement.

The Russian   fired two torpedoes at Augsburg on the night of 28 June, though both missed. Augsburg was assigned to the forces that took part in the Battle of the Gulf of Riga in August 1915. A significant detachment from the High Seas Fleet, including eight dreadnoughts and three battlecruisers, went into the Baltic to clear the Gulf of Riga of Russian naval forces. The Russian surface forces had by this time withdrawn to Moon Sound, and the threat of Russian submarines and mines still in the Gulf prompted the Germans to retreat. On 13 October, an unknown submarine fired a torpedo at Augsburg, though it did not hit her. In September 1916, Augsburg participated in an attempt to force the Irben Strait into the Gulf of Riga in September 1916. Heavy Russian resistance, primarily from the old battleship , forced the Germans to retreat from the Gulf.

1917–1922
In November 1917, Augsburg participated in another attack on the Gulf of Riga, Operation Albion. At 06:00 on 14 October 1917, the three ships left Libau to escort minesweeping operations in the Gulf of Riga. They were attacked by Russian  coastal guns on their approach and were temporarily forced to turn away. By 08:45, however, they had anchored off the Mikailovsk Bank and the minesweepers began to clear a path in the minefields. While the battleships engaged the Russian naval forces, Augsburg was tasked with supervising the occupation of Arensburg.

According to the Armistice that ended the war, Augsburg and the rest of the German fleet not interned in Scapa Flow were to be returned to the main German ports and disarmed. In the subsequent Treaty of Versailles that formally ended the conflict, Augsburg was listed as a warship to be surrendered to the Allied powers; she was to be disarmed in accordance with the terms of the Armistice, but her guns were to remain on board. After the end of World War I, Augsburg was surrendered to Japan as a war prize on 3 September 1920, under the name "Y". The Japanese had no use for the ship, and so she was broken up in Dordrecht in 1922.

Footnotes

References

Further reading
 
 
 

 

Kolberg-class cruisers
Ships built in Kiel
1909 ships
World War I cruisers of Germany